Salah Bey may refer to:

 Salah Bey (town), a town in Algeria
 Salah Bey District
 Salah Bey ben Mostefa (1725–1792), a bey in Ottoman Algeria

See also 
 Salah Bey Viaduct in Constantine, Algeria
 Salah Bey Mosque, in Annaba, Algeria